Chenopodium auricomum, the Queensland bluebush, is a species of flowering plant in the family Amaranthaceae, native to Australia (except Victoria and Tasmania). It is a specialist on heavy soils that are periodically waterlogged.

References

auricomum
Endemic flora of Australia
Flora of Western Australia
Flora of the Northern Territory
Flora of South Australia
Flora of Queensland
Flora of New South Wales
Plants described in 1848